Ivan Nikolayevich Banov (Tatsinskaya stanitsa – 9 February 1982, Moscow) was a Soviet military intelligence officer and partisan movement leader in World War II.

Biography
He entered the Red Army in 1935 and joined the Communist Party in 1939.

An officer in the Red Army's military intelligence at the time of the German invasion of the Soviet Union in 1941, Banov organized several partisan groups behind the German lines that grew to become sizeable formations during the Nazi occupation.

Ivan Banov's partisan fighters carried out significant raids on the occupying German forces and facilitated the Red Army's liberation of the German-occupied territory of the Soviet Union in 1942-1944. Credited with disrupting the enemy supply lines, detonating twenty railroad bridges, and accumulating valuable intelligence material, Banov was recognized with the honorary title of Hero of the Soviet Union in 1944.

He graduated from Frunze Military Academy in 1949 and was promoted in rank to major-general during his post-war service. Banov retired from the military in 1977.

He lived in Moscow and died on 9 February 1982.

Awards
Banov's decorations included both Soviet and foreign military awards, they include:
 Gold Star of the Hero of the Soviet Union,
 two Orders of Lenin,
 Order of the Red Banner,
 Order of the Red Star.
 Order for Service to the Homeland in the Armed Forces of the USSR, 3rd class,
 Medal "Partisan of the Patriotic War" 1st class,
 Medal "For the Victory over Germany in the Great Patriotic War 1941–1945",
 Jubilee Medal "Twenty Years of Victory in the Great Patriotic War 1941-1945", and,
 Jubilee Medal "Thirty Years of Victory in the Great Patriotic War 1941-1945".

References

Sources
  Heroes of the Soviet Union: Ivan Banov

1916 births
1982 deaths
People from Tatsinsky District
People from Don Host Oblast
Communist Party of the Soviet Union members
Soviet major generals
GRU officers
Frunze Military Academy alumni
People of the Soviet invasion of Poland
Soviet military personnel of World War II
Soviet partisans
Russian people of World War II
Heroes of the Soviet Union
Recipients of the Order of Lenin
Recipients of the Order of the Red Banner